Nike Tiempo is a sportswear line designed by Nike and targeted at football players. The range includes mainly football boots, but has also included uniforms and shin guards under the same label.

History
Nike boots sporting the Swoosh logo, exclusive to the brand, were seen during the 1994 FIFA World Cup in the United States. Nike supplied boots to ten of the players in the final between Italy and Brazil. The two were, at the time, among the most successful teams in the world. Sponsorship agreements were reached with Brazilian Romario and Italian Paolo Maldini for the use of Nike Tiempo boots. Such attention broke the dominance of Hummel, Puma, and Adidas, who were the favoured brands for international football players. Later that year, the first Nike cleats became commercially available to the public.

The Nike Tiempo football boot is known for its comfort. It is endorsed by players including Ronaldinho, Sergio Ramos, Carlos Puyol, Gerard Piqué, Jérôme Boateng, Andrea Pirlo, Ji Sung Park, Ido Bleicher and Carlos Tevez, Julie Ertz. 

Most Nike Tiempo boots are available in different versions, ranging in price from $99 to $240. The boot comes in plain and original colors, and can be personalised through the use of NIKEiD. It comes in four different soles: FG (firm ground), SG (soft ground), AG (artificial grass) and IC (indoor).

The Nike Tiempos also come in Elite versions. Similar to other cleats in the Elite series (T90, CTR, SUPERFLY), the chassis of the Legend Elite is made of carbon fiber to reduce weight. The Elite version of the Legend III instead uses a new material called Kanga-Lite. Kanga-Lite is a water-resistant synthetic material that mimics the feel and touch of kangaroo leather while maintaining its performance in all conditions. The first Elite version was released in Metallic Mach/Purple/Total Orange exclusively for the 2010 World Cup in South Africa.

Subsequently the Tiempo has been released under the 10R (Ronaldinho). Ronaldinho has his own version called Ronaldinho Dois.
 
On 1 July 2010, The Nike Tiempo Legend III was released in two colorways: Black/White/Volt and Metallic White/Chilling Red. Subsequent colorways include White/Seaweed/Sport Red, Pearl/Black/Team Orange, White/Black/Del Sol, Black/White/Gold and Metallic Mach/Purple/Total Orange (only available in the Elite versions of the Nike Tiempo).

The launch of the Tiempo Legend IV on 1 July 2011 marked a change in Nike's management of the Tiempo line, introducing an 'Elite' level boot at the time of launch (rather than partway through the boot's lifespan, as with the Legend III).

Whilst the Tiempo Legend IV received several notable updates, including a synthetic 'KangaLite' Leather midfoot and heel to improve stability and the removal of the classic Tiempo tongue, Nike's marketing surrounding the line focused on the Tiempo Legend IV Elite. Featuring Flywire similar to that on the Superfly III, full Carbon Fibre-chassis and 'Premium' kangaroo leather, the Tiempo Legend IV Elite was Nike's lead boot for the autumn of 2011.

Launching in Black/White/Total Orange, the Tiempo Legend IV Elite was the most expensive Tiempo ever, costing £275 (over US$315).

The Nike Tiempo Legend V was launched in December 2013 in Desert Sand/Atomic Orange/Black. This updated version of the Tiempo is 0.8 ounces lighter than its predecessor. Nike's ACC (All Conditions Control) and Hypershield technologies are designed to reduce water uptake, a common problem with natural leather boots.

The Nike Tiempo Legend VI had a more seamless feel, and super-soft leather.

The Nike Tiempo Legend VII was the first version to include Flyknit. The result is a boot with enhanced fit and comfort that is 22% lighter than its predecessor. To help prevent overstretching of the leather toe box, Nike developed Fit-Mesh, which made its debut in the Tiempo Legend VII. also the legend 8 has an upper  similar to the magistas only little bit better in almost everything though.

Special editions 
In 2015, special edition Nike Tiempos were released to commemorate the careers of Ronaldinho and Francesco Totti. They became the most expensive Tiempos in history, costing €300. They were individually numbered and only 3,000 of each were made.

Shin guards
Nike Tiempo shin guards are made out of polypropylene shell for comfortable and durable protection. They have straps for a secure and adjustable fit.

Clothing
 tabltasShorts: 100% polyester, with an elastic waist and an innerdraw cord
 Shirts: 100% polyester, with a crewneck contract collar

See also
Nike Mercurial range, Nike's 'Speed' boot
Nike Total 90 range, Nike's 'Power' boot
Nike CTR360 range, Nike's 'Control' boot
Nike Hypervenom range, Nike's 'Agility' boot

References

External links

 

Nike brands
Nike football boots